Hugo Gstrein was an Austrian cross-country skier who competed in the 1930s. He won a bronze medal in the 4 x 10 km at the 1933 FIS Nordic World Ski Championships in Innsbruck.

External links
World Championship results 

Austrian male cross-country skiers
Possibly living people
Year of birth missing
FIS Nordic World Ski Championships medalists in cross-country skiing